Glen Cummings may refer to:
 Glen Cummings (politician) (born 1944), politician in Manitoba, Canada
 Glen Cummings (musician), American thrash metal guitarist